The Democratic Freedom Movement was a political party in Saint Vincent and the Grenadines.

History
The party was established in 1970, and was led by Kenneth John. It did not run in the 1972 general elections, but nominated two candidates in the 1974 elections, but received just 217 votes and failed to win a seat. The party did not contest any further elections.

In 1978 the party merged with the People's Democratic Congress to form the People's Political Party.

References

Defunct political parties in Saint Vincent and the Grenadines
Political parties established in 1970
1970 establishments in Saint Vincent and the Grenadines
Political parties disestablished in 1978
1978 disestablishments in Saint Vincent and the Grenadines